Nokomis is an unincorporated community in Escambia County, Alabama, United States. Nokomis has the distinction of having boundaries in three U.S. counties:  Escambia, Alabama; Escambia, Florida; and Baldwin, Alabama.

Community Information

Nokomis is a suburb of Atmore, with one fire station, one church and three businesses.

Notable person
Albert Murray, writer and critic, was born in Nokomis

References

Unincorporated communities in Escambia County, Alabama
Unincorporated communities in Alabama